History's Lost and Found is a television show from the History Channel that debuted as a three part series in December 1998. It first aired as a weekly series on August 7, 1999. Each episode is divided into different segments concerning a different "lost" item or artifact from history. Most of the time, the segments do not relate. Each segment runs around 7 minutes and in this time we learn the history, of several famous lost artifacts such as the flags from the Battle of Iwo Jima, and other not so famous artifacts like the first TV Dinner tray. Each segment ends with information on where this item is located. Some segments were reused in other episodes. Episodes of the show were released on VHS in 2001 and the first episode has been released on DVD. 2000 was the big year for the series as most of the episodes were created and aired during that year, but a few new episodes aired in 2004 and 2005. The final segment of each show is the "Auction Block" hosted by Karen Stone and featuring auction specialist Cameron Whiteman from the eBay auction house Butterfields where viewers can bid on a different historical item that they could own for themselves that changed from week to week. The featured item of the week was up for auction until 11:00 PM ET the following Thursday.

The series is based on the book "Lucy's Bones, Sacred Stones and Einstein's Brain" by Harvey Rachlin.

The series was produced by Atlas Media Corporation. Executive Producer: Bruce David Klein.

Repeats
The History Channel continued to air the show in reruns every Sunday morning at 6:00 and 6:30 AM for many years.

The episodes do not air in order and some are shown more often than others.

Episodes

The show originally ran in an hour format featuring six items in each episode. The segments were later edited into episodes of half an hour each featuring three items. These edited episodes are:

References

External links 

 
 
 History's Lost & Found DVD 
 ''Oldest Known' Pair of Levi's(R) Jeans Showcased on The History Channel's 'History's Lost & Found 
 History's Lost and Found - Yahoo TV
 Episode description

History (American TV channel) original programming
1990s American documentary television series
2000s American documentary television series
1999 American television series debuts
2005 American television series endings